The 2021–22 Ohio State Buckeyes women's basketball team represented the Ohio State University during the 2021–22 NCAA Division I women's basketball season. The Buckeyes, led by ninth year head coach Kevin McGuff, played their home games at Value City Arena.  They were members of the Big Ten Conference.

They finished the season 25–7 overall and 14–4 in Big Ten play to finish in a tie for first place.  As the first seed in the Big Ten tournament they defeated eighth seed Michigan State in the Quarterfinals before losing to fifth seed Indiana in the Semifinals.  They received an at-large bid to the NCAA tournament as the sixth seed in the Spokane Region.  They defeated eleventh seed  in the First Round and third seed LSU in the Second Round before losing to second seed Texas in the Sweet Sixteen to end their season.

Previous season
The Buckeyes finished the season 13–7, 9–7 in Big Ten play to finish in seventh place. They did not participate in the Big Ten women's basketball tournament, NCAA tournament or the WNIT due to a self-imposed postseason ban.

Roster

Schedule and results

Source:

|-
!colspan=6 style=| Exhibition

|-
!colspan=6 style=| Regular Season

|-
! colspan=6 style=| Big Ten Women's Tournament

|-
! colspan=6 style=| NCAA tournament

Rankings

Coaches did not release a Week 2 poll and AP does not release a final poll.

References

Ohio State Buckeyes women's basketball seasons
Ohio State
Ohio State Buckeyes
Ohio State Buckeyes
Ohio State